Hum Bhi Akele Tum Bhi Akele is a 2021 Indian Hindi-language film written and directed by Harish Vyas and produced under the banner of First Ray Films. The film stars Anshuman Jha, Zareen Khan along with Ravi Khanvilkar, Gurfateh Pirzada and Nitin Sharma in supporting roles. The film was released on 9 May 2021 on Hotstar. It received generally mixed reviews, with praise for its performances and LGBT themes, but criticism for its screenplay and second half.

Plot 
The film explores friendship between Veer Pratap Randhawa, a gay man and Mansi Dubey, a lesbian woman on a road trip.

Cast 
 Zareen Khan as Mansi Dubey
 Anshuman Jha as Veer Pratap Randhawa
 Ravi Khanvilkar as Mr Dubey
 Gurfateh Pirzada as Akshay Mittal
 Nitin Sharma as Ashar
 Jahnvi Rawat as Nikki Tsong
 Denzil Smith as MLA Tsong

Production
The principal photography of the film started in mid-June 2019.

Release 
The film had its World Premiere at the HBO South Asian International Film Festival & had a successful festival run. Originally the film was scheduled for theatrical release in March 2020 but due to pandemic it observed delays in release and finally the film was released on 9 May 2021 on Hotstar.

Soundtrack 

The film's music was composed by Oni-Adil while lyrics written by Bulleh Shah, Sourabh Negi and Pratyush Prakash.

Reception
Sana Farzeen of The Indian Express wrote: "Hum Bhi Akele Tum Bhi Akele started on a promising note. However, it soon faltered with the makers wanting to add too many twists to the tale." Udita Jhunjhunwala in her review for Firstpost rated the film 2/5 and appreciated the performances of Khan and Zha but criticized its slow narration. "Hum Bhi Akele Tum Bhi Akele has some freshness, but its the mawkish climax that rids the story of any realism," Jhunjhunwala added.

Cinema Express critic Shilajit Mitra, who also rated the film 2/5, stated: "The film is pleasantly shot, in sync with its chilled-out score, but its need to verbalise everything ruins all intimacy."

References

External links 
 
 

Indian LGBT-related films
2021 films
2020s Hindi-language films
Disney+ Hotstar original films
2021 direct-to-video films